El Balyana (Tpolubianē) is a small town in the Sohag Governorate of Upper Egypt. Located on the west bank of the Nile, it is situated near the ancient Egyptian city of Abydos.

History 
The modern city name comes from a Coptic distortion of a Greek name Polybius. El Balyana was formerly a village belonging to the city of Bardes or the region of Bardes and then at the beginning of the last century was transferred to the center of the town of Balyana and became Bardes, a village belonging to the city of Balyana.

See also

 List of cities and towns in Egypt

References

Populated places in Sohag Governorate
Abydos, Egypt